Several units of the Royal Canadian Navy have been named HMCS Kitchener.

 , a  renamed Vancouver before launching. The ship served in the Battle of the Atlantic during the Second World War.
 , a  that was ordered as Vancouver (K225) and renamed before launching that served in the Battle of the Atlantic during the Second World War.

Battle honours
Atlantic, 1942–43
Gulf of St. Lawrence, 1942
Normandy, 1944
 English Channel, 1944–45

References

 Government of Canada Ships' Histories - HMCS Kitchener

Royal Canadian Navy ship names